Reino Jaakko Matias Hiltunen (16 November 1924 – 21 August 2021) was a Finnish triple jumper who competed in the 1952 Summer Olympics. He was born in Helsinki in November 1924 and died in Vaasa in August 2021, at the age of 96.

References

1924 births
2021 deaths
Athletes (track and field) at the 1952 Summer Olympics
Finnish male triple jumpers
Olympic athletes of Finland
Athletes from Helsinki